The Ellsworth Street Bridge  is a highway bridge that crosses the Willamette River in Albany, Oregon, United States. Built in 1925, the two-lane structure carries U.S. Route 20 eastbound traffic, with the adjacent Lyon Street Bridge carrying westbound traffic. The  steel truss bridge was designed by Conde McCullough and opened in 1926.

History
In 1887, a bridge was built across the Willamette River at Albany for the Corvallis and Eastern Railroad followed by the Steel Bridge built in 1893 just downriver. The state of Oregon began building a new bridge across the river at the city in 1925 to carry vehicular traffic. Designed by state highway department bridge designer Conde McCullough, it was constructed by the Union Bridge Company based in Portland, Oregon. The steel truss structure was completed in 1926.

When the bridge opened, the Albany-Corvallis Highway was completed. At the time the structure was named the Albany Bridge. In 1973, the neighboring Lyon Street Bridge was completed to the east to expand capacity to a total of four lanes between the two bridges. Ellsworth Street Bridge was refurbished in 1971 and 2002. As of 2004, the bridge handled an average of 9,850 cars per day.

Details
Classified as functionally obsolete with a 53.8-percent sufficiency rating, the two-lane bridge carries eastbound traffic of U.S. Route 20 south into downtown Albany at milepost 10.44. The bridge's main span consists of four steel through-trusses in the Parker style, each  in length. The seven concrete approaches are of a girder design. The green colored bridge also has ornate concrete railings and entrance pylons. Ellsworth Street Bridge was of the few steel truss bridges completed while McCullough was in charge of bridge design in Oregon, and it is one of the few multi-span steel truss bridges remaining in the state.

See also

List of bridges documented by the Historic American Engineering Record in Oregon
List of crossings of the Willamette River
Picture from 2008

References

External links

Bridges completed in 1926
U.S. Route 20
Bridges in Linn County, Oregon
Bridges over the Willamette River
Bridges in Benton County, Oregon
Buildings and structures in Albany, Oregon
Road bridges in Oregon
Historic American Engineering Record in Oregon
Bridges by Conde McCullough
1926 establishments in Oregon
Bridges of the United States Numbered Highway System
Steel bridges in the United States
Parker truss bridges in the United States